The Lagoas de Cufada Natural Park is found in Guinea-Bissau. It was established on 1 December 2000. This site is 890 km. It was the first protected area in Guinea-Bissau.

Chimpanzees are reported to live in the National Park, making nests in oil palms, but details are lacking about density and size of the chimpanzee population within the protected area (Kormos et al. 2003)

Other animals found at the site include; Hippopotamus (Hippopotamus amphibius), Waterbuck (Kobus ellipsiprymnus), Roan antelope (Hippotragus equinus), African buffalo (Syncerus caffer), Leopard (Panthera pardus), Hyenas and African dwarf crocodile (Osteolaemus tetraspis).

References

Kormos, R., Boesch, C. Bakarr, M. I. and Butynaski, T. M. 2003. West African Chimpanzees. Status Survey and Conservation Action Plan. IUCN/SSC Primate Specialist Group. IUCN, Gland, Switzerland and Cambridge, UK.

National parks of Guinea-Bissau
Protected areas established in 2000
Ramsar sites in Guinea-Bissau
Lakes of Guinea-Bissau